KTFF-DT (channel 61) is a television station licensed to Porterville, California, United States, broadcasting the Spanish-language UniMás network to the Fresno area. It is owned and operated by TelevisaUnivision alongside Hanford-licensed Univision outlet KFTV-DT (channel 21). Both stations share studios on Univision Plaza near the corner of North Palm and West Herndon avenues in northwestern Fresno, while KTFF's transmitter is located on Blue Ridge in rural northwestern Tulare County.

The station's programming is relayed to the northern half of the market on low-power translator station KTFF-LD (channel 41) in Fresno, with transmitter on Bald Mountain near Meadow Lakes. It is also simulcast in high-definition on KFTV-DT's sixth digital subchannel (channel 21.6) from a separate transmitter on Bald Mountain.

History
The station first signed on the air on May 6, 1992 as KKAK; originally operating as an independent station, the station aired a mix of infomercials, religious and home shopping programs. The station changed its call letters to KKAG in 1994. In 1998, KKAG was sold to Paxson Communications (now Ion Media Networks). On August 31 of that year, the station became an owned-and-operated station of Paxson's family-oriented television network Pax TV upon its launch, and changed its call letters to KPXF. In 2003, Paxson sold KPXF to Univision Communications, creating a duopoly with Univision O&O KFTV (channel 21); after the sale was finalized, the station's calls were changed to KTFF, it also became an owned-and-operated station of Univision's secondary network TeleFutura (which relaunched as UniMás on February 7, 2013).

Univision subsequently purchased Shop at Home affiliate KAJA-LP (channel 68, now on channel 41) from Cocola Broadcasting to become a fill-in translator for KTFF, adopting the KTFF-LD call letters (ironically, the KAJA calls are currently used as a brand name for low-power station K68DJ in Corpus Christi, Texas, which also broadcasts on UHF channel 68).

In 2007, the Federal Communications Commission (FCC) issued an order concerning KTFF and former owner Paxson Communications, denying a review of the sale of KTFF to Univision; it also implemented a deal with Christian Network, Inc. (CNI), parent company of The Worship Network (which formerly carried its programming on Pax TV's stations as both a late night block and later as a dedicated subchannel service), giving the religious broadcaster the right to program KTFF seven days a week from 1 to 6 a.m. In addition, the station was required to provide a digital channel for CNI's exclusive use (so long as certain conditions are met), after KTFF signed on its digital signal, if it used two or more subchannel slots. However, KTFF broadcasts UniMás programming full-time, though the date the station stopped carrying The Worship Network is unknown. It is also unknown if the discontinuance is tied to Pax's successor, Ion Television, ending carriage of The Worship Network in 2010.

Technical information

Subchannels
The station's digital signal is multiplexed:

Translator

Analog-to-digital conversion
KTFF-TV shut down its analog signal, over UHF channel 61, on June 12, 2009, the official date in which full-power television stations in the United States transitioned from analog to digital broadcasts under federal mandate. The station's digital signal remained on its pre-transition UHF channel 48. Through the use of PSIP, digital television receivers display the station's virtual channel as its former UHF analog channel 61, which was among the high band UHF channels (52-69) that were removed from broadcasting use as a result of the transition.

Spectrum auction repack
KTFF-DT is one of nearly 1,000 television stations that were required to change their digital channel allocation in the spectrum auction repack in late 2017 or early 2018. KTFF was to reallocate its digital signal to UHF channel 23 in phase one of the repack. The FCC licensed the station to broadcast on channel 23 on December 20, 2018.

References

External links

TFF-DT
Television channels and stations established in 1992
1992 establishments in California
UniMás network affiliates
Quest (American TV network) affiliates
Porterville, California
TFF-DT